Brayopsis is a genus of flowering plants belonging to the family Brassicaceae.

Its native range is Western South America to Northwestern Argentina.

Species:

Brayopsis alpaminae 
Brayopsis calycina 
Brayopsis chacasensis 
Brayopsis colombiana 
Brayopsis cuscoensis 
Brayopsis diapensioides 
Brayopsis gamosepala 
Brayopsis limensis 
Brayopsis monimocalyx

References

Brassicaceae
Brassicaceae genera